Blake Street can refer to:

 Blake Street (York), a road in York, in England
 Blake Street railway station, a station in Sutton Coldfield, in England
 The location of the Coors Field in Denver, Colorado, which led to the Blake Street Bombers nickname